Schwarzhofen is a municipality  in the district of Schwandorf in Bavaria, Germany.

Climate

Neighbouring communities 
The neighbouring communities clockwise: Niedermurach, Dieterskirchen, Neunburg vorm Wald, Altendorf.

References

Schwandorf (district)